Saint-Antonin may refer to the following places:

In France

Saint-Antonin, Alpes-Maritimes, in the Alpes-Maritimes  département
Saint-Antonin, Gers, in the Gers  département 
Saint-Antonin-de-Lacalm, in the Tarn  département
Saint-Antonin-de-Sommaire, in the Eure  département 
Saint-Antonin-du-Var, in the Var  département
Saint-Antonin-Noble-Val, in the Tarn-et-Garonne département 
Saint-Antonin-sur-Bayon, in the Bouches-du-Rhône  département

In Canada

Saint-Antonin, Québec